The Llanos de Moxos (Moxos Plains), also known as the Llanos de Mojos and the Beni Savanna, have extensive remains of pre-Columbian agricultural societies scattered over most of Beni Department, Bolivia. The remains testify to a well-organized and numerous indigenous people. This contradicts the traditional view of archaeologists, notably Betty Meggers, who asserted that the Amazon River Basin was not environmentally able to sustain a large population and that its indigenous inhabitants were hunter-gatherer bands or slash-and-burn farmers. In the 1960s, petroleum company geologists and geographer William Denevan were among the first to publicize the existence of extensive prehistoric earthworks constructed in the Amazon, especially in the Llanos de Moxos. 

Many types of earthworks have been documented in the Llanos, including monumental mounds, raised fields for agriculture, natural and constructed forest islands, canals, causeways, ring ditches, and fish weirs. Archaeological investigations in the Llanos have not been extensive and many questions remain about the cultures of the prehistoric inhabitants. To date, there is no evidence that the inhabitants were politically united in pre-Columbian times, but rather they seem to have been organized into a large number of small, independent polities speaking a variety of different, unrelated languages. Lidar data reported in 2022 may reveal much about sites that have not been investigated. This may help to establish a clearer understanding of these prehistoric cultures. 

Evidence of people living in the Llanos dates back to 8000 BC. Archaeologists have found artifacts in the monumental mounds dating to as early as 800 BC. The Llanos were heavily populated by indigenous people until the arrival of the Spanish in the late 17th century.

Environment 

This area is characterized by flat terrain, many rivers and shallow lakes, and a tropical climate with pronounced wet and dry seasons. Fifty to sixty percent of the land is flooded from four to ten months per year. The Llanos are located mostly in the drainage basin of the Mamoré River. 

The main contemporary urban center in the Llanos is the present-day city of Trinidad. East of that city is Casarabe. The settlement characteristic of the Casarabe culture is being described as low-density urbanism that developed between AD 500 and 1400.

Historically, archaeologists and geographers held that large, complex pre-Columbian societies were unable to develop and flourish in the lowland forests of the Amazon basin because of poor soils for agriculture, protein deficiency of inhabitants, lack of domesticated animals, and limited technology. In 2008, that view was challenged following investigation of ruins in the Llanos de Moxos. More recent lidar data has enabled assessments to develop rapidly that could have taken decades using archaeological methods to prove the inaccuracy of the misjudgment. The lidar data reveals construction by the inhabitants that overcame natural deficiencies. 

In general, soil fertility in the Llanos decreases from south to north. The soils of the southernmost Llanos benefit from the deposits of sediments by rivers flowing down from the nearby Andes. The quantities of those sediments decrease northward and the typical infertile lateritic soils of the Amazon prevail. Associated with pre-historic settlements is Amazonian dark earth, called "terra mulata" or terra preta. These highly-productive soils are the product of human occupation and endeavors to improve soil fertility. The people of the Moxos plains domesticated their landscape by practicing raised bed agriculture and improving soils by the addition of organic matter.

Earthworks 

Disagreements about the anthropogenic origin of many of the earthworks in the Llanos de Moxos continue. Likewise, authorities disagree on the number and social complexity of the people who constructed the earthworks, some postulating a large population, others a small population that built the earthworks over a long period of time. Stonework, characteristic of the highland civilization west of the Llanos, was not a feature because there was no surface stone in the area.

Mounds (lomas in Spanish) are scattered throughout the Llanos de Moxos. The total number of mounds is estimated at 20,000. Mounds are concentrated in several areas, suggesting that several regional polities existed, each with its residential and ceremonial centers.

The raised fields permitted drainage during the rainy season. Maize and cassava (Yuka) were probably the principal crops.

Forest islands rise above the surrounding swamps. Many are constructed artificially, the products of abandoned monumental mounds and human settlements. Forest islands were used for home sites, agriculture, hunting, and harvesting of wild plant products.

Canals and causeways often connected areas of human settlement, radiating outward from the large mounds. They served multiple functions: transportation, drainage, boundary markers, and enhancing fishery resources. Zigzag causeways in some areas are interpreted as being fish weirs.  Fish were probably the main source of protein for the pre-historic inhabitants.

Ring ditches are found in many areas. Ditches were constructed to encircle areas of human settlement and functioned both for drainage of water in the rainy season and for storage of water during the dry season.

Variations among regions 
Four eco-archaeological regions are identified in the Llanos de Moxos.

Region one - North of the city of Santa Ana del Yacuma and west of the Mamoré River is an area of water-logged and poor soils.  Many large raised agricultural fields are the distinctive remains of its prehistoric inhabitants, the raised fields being necessary for drainage and improvement of the soils.  Although there was probably a large pre-historic population in this region, there is little evidence of a complex society.

Region two - East of the Mamoré River and centered on the town of Baures and the Baures River is an area of many forested islands, mostly natural, which were inhabited and circled by ditched agricultural fields, ring ditches, fish weirs, and many canals and zigzag causeways.  It appears that the earthworks in this area were constructed not long before the Spanish arrived.

Region three - West of the city of Trinidad centered on the town of San Ignacio de Moxos is an area in which soils are relatively fertile and hosting a large number of earthworks, including mounds, man-made forested islands, raised fields and causeways.  The proliferation of earthworks and their variety suggest a more complex pre-historic society than those of regions one and two.

Region four - East of the city of Trinidad and centered on the town of Casarabe is the most fertile and the least-waterlogged region of the Llanos.  It contains large numbers of monumental mounds and associated agricultural fields and integrated earthworks. This region probably hosted the most complex societies of the pre-historic Llanos de Moxos.

People 
Archaeologists have found indirect evidence of a human presence in the Llanos de Moxos dating to 8000 BC in shell middens on several forest islands.

Some of the artifacts in the monumental mounds have been radiocarbon dated to as long ago as 800 BC. The early Spaniards found six principal ethnic groups in the Llanos:  the Moxo (or Mojo), Movima, Canichana, Cayuvava, Itonama, and Bauré.  The names of 26 other groups are known.  The Baure were considered by the Spanish to be the most "civilized", followed by the Moxo.  The other groups lived in smaller communities and on less favored lands.  The Canichana or Canisiana were warlike hunters who occupied prime riverfront property on the Mamoré River.

The Llanos were a patchwork of unrelated languages.  The Baure and Moxo spoke Arawak languages. Linguists believe that the Arawakan peoples originated further north in the central Amazon basin and migrated to the Llanos, bringing their cassava-based agriculture with them.  Most of the other ethnic groups were probably earlier inhabitants of the Llanos than the Arawak-speakers, although the distinct hunting and warrior culture of the Canichana suggests they may have only recently migrated into the Llanos at the time of first contact with the Spanish Empire.

Archaeologist Clark Erickson summarized the early Spanish description of Baure villages:

Early Spanish explorers in 1617 reported Llanos villages with up to 400 houses.  Modern scholars have calculated that such a village would have a population of about 2000 people.

Denevan estimated the pre-Columbian population of the Llanos de Moxos at 350,000 and a population of 100,000 in 1690 when Jesuit Catholic priests first established missions in the Llanos.  David Block, to the contrary, estimated only about 30,000 inhabitants of the Llanos in 1679.  Whichever is more correct, the pre-Columbian population had declined due to the introduction of European diseases, the impact of conquest, and Spanish and Portuguese slave raids.  In 1720, the Jesuits in the Llanos counted approximately 30,000 residents in their missions.  The population of the Llanos remained fairly stable after that until the nineteenth century.

References

Archaeological sites in Bolivia
Prehistory of Bolivia
Ruins in Bolivia
Beni Department
Amazon basin
Pre-Columbian cultures
Pre-Columbian indigenous peoples of the Amazon